Honduras traditionally had a two-party system, dominated by the Liberal Party of Honduras and the National Party of Honduras.

The parties

Parliamentary parties

Extraparliamentary parties

 Innovation and Unity Party (Partido Innovación y Unidad Social Demócrata, PINU-SD)
 We All Are Honduras Party (Partido Todos Somos Honduras, TSH)
 Honduran Patriotic Alliance (Partido Alianza Patriótica Hondureña, Alianza Patriótica)

Previous parties
Communist Party of Honduras (Partido Comunista de Honduras, PCH)
Honduran Revolutionary Party (Partido Revolucionario Hondureño, PRH)
Morazanista National Liberation Party (Partido Morazanista de Liberación Nacional, PMLN)
Party for the Transformation of Honduras (Partido para la transformación de Honduras, PTH)
Patriotic Renewal Party (Partido Renovación Patriótica, PRP)
Revolutionary Democratic Party of Honduras (Partido Democratico Revolucionario de Honduras, PDRH)
Revolutionary Nationalist Movement (Movimiento Nacional Revolucionario, MNR)
Socialist Party of Honduras (Partido Socialista, PASO)
Broad Front (Partido Frente Amplio, FAPER)
Democratic Unification Party (Partido Unificación Democrática, UD)
Democratic Liberation Party of Honduras (Partido Liberación Democrático de Honduras, LIDERH)
Go-Solidary Movement (Partido VA: Movimiento Solidario, VAMOS)
New Route (Partido Nueva Ruta, Nueva Ruta)

See also
 Liberalism in Honduras

General:
 Politics of Honduras

References 

Honduras
 
Political parties
Political parties
Honduras